Balsamorhiza serrata (serrate balsamroot) is a North American species of plants in the tribe Heliantheae of the family Asteraceae.

Distribution and habitat
The plant is native to the Western United States, including the Great Basin region.

It has been found in Washington, Oregon, northern Nevada, and the Modoc Plateau in Modoc County of northeastern California. It grows in dry, rocky knolls and rock outcrops.

Description
Balsamorhiza serrata  is an herb up to 30 cm (12 inches) tall. Leaves have teeth along the edges, hence the name "serrata."

It has yellow flower heads, usually borne one at a time, with both ray florets and disc florets.

References

serrata
Flora of California
Flora of Nevada
Flora of Oregon
Flora of Washington (state)
Flora of the Great Basin
Endemic flora of the United States
Plants described in 1913
Taxa named by Thomas Nuttall
Flora without expected TNC conservation status